Henry Adams Neely (May 14, 1830 – October 31, 1899) was the second bishop of Maine in the Episcopal Church in the United States of America.

Early life and education
Neely was born on May 14, 1830, in Fayetteville, New York, the son of Albert Neely and Phoebe Pearsall. He studied at Hobart College and graduated in 1849. He also worked as a tutor between 1850 and 1852, whilst he was studying for a Bachelor of Divinity. In 1866 he was awarded a Doctor of Divinity from Hobart.

Ordained ministry
Neely was ordained deacon on December 19, 1852, in Geneva, New York, and a priest on June 18, 1854, in Trinity Church, Utica, New York. He served as rector of Calvary Church in Utica, New York. Between 1855 and 1862 he served as rector of Christ Church in Rochester, New York, and then moved on to become chaplain at Hobart College, where he remained till 1864. After that, he became assistant minister at Trinity Church in New York City, a post he held till 1867.

Episcopacy
Neely was elected Bishop of Maine in 1866 and was consecrated on January 25, 1867, in Trinity Church by Presiding Bishop John Henry Hopkins. Upon his arrival in Maine he served as rector of St Luke's parish. He was influential in establishing a cathedral and the church of St Luke was designated as the cathedral however a new church was to be built instead. Upon its completion St Luke's Cathedral was consecrated by Bishop Neely on October 18, 1877. He died in office on October 31, 1899.

Family
Neely married Mary Floyd Delafield in 1851 and together has two children.

References

1830 births
1899 deaths
People from Fayetteville, New York
19th-century American Episcopalians
Episcopal bishops of Maine
19th-century American clergy